John Benson Jenkins (September 8, 1859 – December 7, 1916) was an American attorney. He served as president of the Virginia State Bar Association from July 1916 until his suicide the following December.

References

1859 births
1916 deaths
Virginia Democrats
19th-century American lawyers
20th-century American lawyers